Julius Nättinen (born 14 January 1997) is a Finnish professional ice hockey forward who is currently playing with HIFK of the Liiga. He was drafted by the Anaheim Ducks in the second round, 59th overall, in the 2015 NHL Entry Draft.

Playing career
Nättinen played as a youth in his native Finland and made his Liiga debut playing a solitary game with JYP Jyväskylä during the 2013–14 season.

On 16 July 2015, Nättinen was signed to a three-year entry-level contract by the Anaheim Ducks. He left Finland after the draft to continue his development playing major junior hockey in the Ontario Hockey League (OHL) after he was selected by the Barrie Colts, 51st overall in the CHL Import Draft in 2015.

After his rookie season in the OHL with the Colts in the 2015–16 season and having scored 71 points in just 52 games, Nättinen was traded to the Windsor Spitfires on 26 June 2016.

In his first North American professional season, Nättinen was assigned to the Ducks' American Hockey League (AHL) affiliate, the San Diego Gulls, for the duration of the 2017–18 season. Unable to find his scoring touch, Nättinen produced just 4 goals in 55 games. Following the Ducks' 2018 training camp, Nättinen was among the first round of cuts and rather than return to the AHL, opted for a mutual release from his contract with the Ducks on 24 September 2018.

Following the termination of his NHL contract, Nättinen returned to his original Liiga club, JYP Jyväskylä, securing a three-year contract on 25 September 2018.  Nättinen led Liiga with 33 goals scored in the 2019–20 season.

On July 3, 2020, Nättinen signed a one-year contract with HC Ambrì-Piotta of the National League (NL). He was forced to sit out the first two weeks of the regular season in early October with a groin strain. Nättinen then went on to score 12 goals in his first 10 regular season games. He finished his lone season in Switzerland with 17 goals and 25 points through 32 games.

On 20 May 2021, Nättinen moved to Sweden as a free agent, agreeing to a one-year contract with reigning champions Växjö Lakers of the Swedish Hockey League (SHL).

After a lone season with Växjö, Nättinen left at the conclusion of his contract with returned to the Finnish Liiga in agreeing to a two-year contract with HIFK on 10 May 2022.

Career statistics

Regular season and playoffs

International

References

External links
 

1997 births
Living people
HC Ambrì-Piotta players
Anaheim Ducks draft picks
Barrie Colts players
Finnish ice hockey forwards
HIFK (ice hockey) players
JYP Jyväskylä players
Sportspeople from Jyväskylä
San Diego Gulls (AHL) players
Växjö Lakers players
Windsor Spitfires players
21st-century Finnish people